Paul Le Mat (born September 22, 1945) is an American actor. He first came to prominence with his role in American Graffiti (1973); his performance was met with critical acclaim and earned him the Golden Globe Award for New Star of the Year - Actor.

Le Mat's breakout performance in American Graffiti landed him the lead role in box office hit Aloha, Bobby and Rose (1975). He also is known for his work in the Jonathan Demme films Handle with Care (1977) and Melvin and Howard (1980). He won another Golden Globe award for his performance in the TV film The Burning Bed (1984) and starred in the cult film Puppet Master (1989) which spawned a franchise.

Early life and education
Le Mat was born to Matthew (1914–1963) and Paula Le Mat (1912–1990). He graduated from Newport Harbor High School in 1963, and attended San Diego City College, Cypress Junior College, Chapman College, and eventually received an Associate of Arts degree from Los Angeles Valley College. Le Mat served in the Vietnam War with the U.S. Navy on an SP-5B Marlin seaplane in a maritime patrol squadron.

Career
Le Mat starred in the pilot episode of Firehouse in 1973. In 1972, he appeared in American Graffiti (released in 1973), a coming-of-age film about a group of friends in Modesto, California in the early 1960s. He played John Milner - a role that would earn him his first Golden Globe Award. The film received universal acclaim and was a box office smash. Le Mat also starred in Floyd Mutrux's 1975 crime spree film Aloha, Bobby and Rose, another commercial hit. 

In 1977, he starred in Jonathan Demme's acclaimed comedy Citizens Band, later re-titled Handle with Care. Le Mat would reunite with Demme for 1980's Melvin and Howard, in which he played the titular role of Melvin Dummar. The film was based upon the true story of a gas station attendant who claimed to be an heir of eccentric billionaire Howard Hughes, and it won two Academy Awards. Le Mat was nominated for a Golden Globe Award. In 1979, Le Mat reprised his role of John Milner in More American Graffiti.

In 1982, Le Mat played the character John Dortmunder in Jimmy the Kid, opposite Gary Coleman in the role of Jimmy. He also provided the voice of Omar in the American release of the animated film Rock & Rule. Le Mat starred in the made-for-TV movie The Burning Bed with Farrah Fawcett. The film was based on the true story of an abusive husband who drives his wife to drastic measures with his aggressive ways. Le Mat was awarded the second Golden Globe Award of his career for his role in the film. He starred in other television films such as The Night They Saved Christmas, Into the Homeland and Secret Witness. He appeared in the TV miniseries On Wings of Eagles and in the film Puppet Master. 

In the 1990s, Le Mat worked on independent films and TV movies. He played Josiah Peale in Lonesome Dove: The Series and in the follow-up Lonesome Dove: The Outlaw Years. He had a small role in the 1998 film American History X. More recently, Le Mat starred in the film Stateside.

Personal life
He married Suzanne de Passe in 1978 Le Mat and de Passe have since divorced.

Filmography

References

External links
 
 
 

1945 births
Living people
American male film actors
Best Supporting Actor Golden Globe (television) winners
Chapman University alumni
Cypress College alumni
Los Angeles Valley College people
Male actors from New Jersey
New Star of the Year (Actor) Golden Globe winners
Newport Harbor High School alumni
People from Rahway, New Jersey
San Diego City College alumni
United States Navy personnel of the Vietnam War
United States Navy sailors